Como Lake Park is a  park in Erie County, in the U.S. state of New York. It is operated by the Erie County Department of Parks, Recreation and Forestry. Access is free and it is open to the public year-round.

History
Como Lake Park, named after the Lake Como tourist resort in Italy, was originally established by the village of Lancaster in 1923 and acquired by Erie County in 1926 as the result of a special village election. Many of the park's facilities and stone structures were built or improved by the Works Progress Administration in the 1930s.

The park originally featured a small zoo and a  toboggan run. Both of these attractions have since been removed.

Attractions and facilities
 Como Lake Park features a  man-made lake with a small lighthouse.
 The park includes nature trails, 62 picnic shelters, a disc golf course, a soccer field, four tennis courts and two basketball courts.
 During the winter, the park features  of trails and unplowed roads suitable for cross-country skiing or snowshoeing, two free ice-skating rinks, and a sledding hill.

References

External links
Map of Como Lake Park

Parks in Erie County, New York